Michał Marek Łubniewski (born 20 October 1993) is a Polish sprint canoeist. He participated at the 2018 ICF Canoe Sprint World Championships.

References

External links

1993 births
Polish male canoeists
Living people
ICF Canoe Sprint World Championships medalists in Canadian
European Games competitors for Poland
Canoeists at the 2019 European Games